Tichakorn Boonlert (born 22 March 2001 in Nonthaburi) is a Thai indoor volleyball player. She is a member of the Thailand women's national volleyball team.

Club
  3BB Nakornnont (2016–Present)

Awards

Club
 2017 Thai–Denmark Super League -  Bronze medal, with 3BB Nakornnont
 2018 Thai–Denmark Super League -  Bronze medal, with 3BB Nakornnont
 2018–19 Thailand League -  Third, with 3BB Nakornnont
 2019 Thai–Denmark Super League -  Third, with 3BB Nakornnont

References

External links
 FIVB Biography

2001 births
Living people
Tichakorn Boonlert
Tichakorn Boonlert
Competitors at the 2019 Southeast Asian Games
Tichakorn Boonlert
Southeast Asian Games medalists in volleyball
Middle blockers
Competitors at the 2021 Southeast Asian Games
Tichakorn Boonlert
Tichakorn Boonlert